Coelogyne ovalis is a species of orchid found in East Asia.

ovalis